, also called  but commonly referred to as , is an 11th century Japanese collection of Buddhist tales and folklore (setsuwa).  It was compiled by the monk  from 1040 to 1043, and consists of three volumes with 129 chapters, two of which are missing.  The collection is intended to promote the Lotus Sutra with tales of miraculous events linked to the sutra.

Origin
In the introduction to the book, Chingen referred to a now-lost collection of tales by the Chinese monk Yiji (義寂) titled Fahua yanji (法華験記), which may be the inspiration for this collection. Some scholars suggest that text referred to may be by a Korean monk with the same name in Chinese Ŭijŏk (義寂), although Chingen may have consulted both the Chinese and Korean collections. The tales he collected, however, are Japanese only, which Chingen noted in the preface are meant for ordinary people rather than priests and scholars.

Content
Chingen organised his tales roughly chronologically from the time of Prince Shōtoku in chapters that are based on the seven groups of the Buddhist order; these are bodhisattvas, monks, male novices, nuns, laymen and laywomen, and animals and other non-human entities.

The collection contains setsuwa tales or biographical stories of advocates and devotees (jikyōsha, 持経者) of the Lotus Sutra, many of them from the Heian period. Most of them (over 90 out of 127) feature in some way Buddhist ascetics or  who lived in the mountains. 31 of the tales involve laymen and warriors. In this collection, the worship of Japanese gods and Buddha is given in syncretic manner, and some Japanese deities appear as boddhisatvas.

There are two general categories of setsuwa. The first describes the activities of the devotees and their observances of the precepts of the Lotus Sutra. The second involves miraculous tales that illustrate the power of the Lotus Sutra. A notable example of the folktales in the collection is the first appearance of the story of Anchin and Kiyohime, although neither were specifically named in the story.  The collection of tales is intended to promote the Lotus Sutra, emphasising stories of people as well as animals and supernatural beings who had experienced miracles in relation to the Lotus Sutra, suggesting that believers can benefit by copying, reciting and their devotion to the sutra.

Translation

The collection has been translated into English by Yoshiko K. Dykstra and published as Miraculous Tales of the Lotus Sutra from Ancient Japan: The Dainihonkoku Hokekyokenki of Priest Chingen.

References

Japanese mythology
Japanese Buddhist texts
Buddhism in fiction
Late Old Japanese texts
Heian period in literature
Setsuwa
11th-century Japanese books